The 2021 Campeonato Brasileiro Feminino A-2 is the 5th season of the Campeonato Brasileiro de Futebol Feminino Série A2, the second level of women's football in Brazil. The tournament is organized by the Brazilian Football Confederation (CBF). It started on 15 May and scheduled to end on 5 September 2021.

It is played by 36 teams, which qualified through state championships or other tournaments held by each of the state federations, and also by the men's CBF ranking. This last criterion exists because of the requirement that, as of 2019, all Campeonato Brasileiro Série A teams in men's football a professional and youth soccer team, either in its own structure or by partnership.

Format
In the first stage, the teams were divided into six groups of six teams each. Each group was played on a single round-robin basis. The top two teams of each group and the best third-placed teams advanced to the round od 16.

Starting from the round of 16, the teams will play a single-elimination tournament on a home-and-away two-legged basis. The teams qualified for the semifinals will be promoted to 2022 Campeonato Brasileiro Feminino Série A1

Tiebreaker criteria 
In case of a tie in points between two clubs, the tie-breaking criteria will be applied in the following order:
 Number of wins
 Goal balance
 Goals scored
 Number of red cards
 Number of yellow cards
 Prize draw

Teams

Group stage

Group A

Group B

Group C

Group D

Group E

Group F

Ranking of third-placed teams

Final stages

Bracket

Round of 16

Red Bull Bragantino won 4–1 on aggregate and advanced to quarter-finals.

Athletico Paranaense won 7–0 on aggregate and advanced to quarter-finals.

Tied 2–2 on aggregate, Real Ariquemes won on penalties and advanced to quarter-finals.

ESMAC won 1–0 on aggregate and advanced to quarter-finals.

América Mineiro won 3–2 on aggregate and advanced to quarter-finals.

Atlético Mineiro won 3–1 on aggregate and advanced to quarter-finals.

Ceará won 5–2 on aggregate and advanced to quarter-finals.

Tied 1–1 on aggregate, CRESSPOM won on penalties and advanced to quarter-finals.

Quarter-finals

Tied 4–4 on aggregate, Red Bull Bragantino won on penalties and advance to the semi-finals.

ESMAC won 3–2 on aggregate and advance to the semi-finals.

Atlético Mineiro won 3–1 on aggregate and advance to the semi-finals.

CRESSPOM won 2–0 on aggregate and advance to the semi-finals.

Semi-finals

Bragantino won 3–1 on aggregate and advance to the Finals. 

Atlético Mineiro won 2–0 on aggregate and advance to the Finals.

Finals

Final classification

References

Women's football leagues in Brazil
2021 in Brazilian football